Sean Sullivan (born 28 December 1968 in Otara, Auckland) is a professional boxer from New Zealand. He was ranked as the world's seventh best welterweight by the WBA and the IBF. Sullivan has held national titles in five weight divisions in New Zealand (welterweight, light-middleweight, middleweight, super-middleweight, and light-heavyweight). Sullivan has been inactive since 2008 but has not formally announced his retirement. He was working as a debt-collector . In 2009 he was jailed for six months for defrauding Housing New Zealand.

Professional boxing record

References

External links
 

Living people
1968 births
New Zealand male boxers
New Zealand professional boxing champions
Middleweight boxers